The Uchur (Uçur) is a river in Khabarovsk Krai and Yakutia in Russia, a right tributary of the Aldan (Lena's basin). The Uchur freezes up in November and breaks up in May. Its main tributaries are the Uyan, Tyrkan, Gonam, and Gynym. 
The Gynym, a tributary of the Uchur, marks the southern border of the Sunnagyn Range.

References 

 

Rivers of Khabarovsk Krai
Rivers of the Sakha Republic